Ikin is a surname. People bearing the name include:

 Ben Ikin (born 1977), Australian rugby player
 David Ikin (born 1946), English football player
 Humphrey Ikin (born 1957), New Zealander furniture designer
 Jack Ikin (1918–1984), English cricket player for Lancashire, father of Michael Ikin
 Michael Ikin (born 1946), English cricket player for Staffordshire, son of Jack Ikin
 Van Ikin (born 1951), Australian author

References